The Andorran diner (ADD) is a commemorative currency issued in form of coins intended for collectors and without a legal tender value. A diner is divided into 100 cèntims. The name diner (money in Catalan) is derived from the Roman currency denarius.

The Servei d'Emissions de la Vegueria Episcopal has issued from 1977 onwards various series of diner denominated coins. Previously there were minor privately issued diner coinage (with no legal value). There have been silver, golder and bimetallic issues. The most commemorated topic is Charlemagne.

The exchange rate was defined (informally) as 100 ESP (0.60 EUR) or 5 FRF (~125 ESP or 0.75 EUR) to one diner. But there is no bank or other authority where visitors to Andorra can change diners for euros. It is only an informal relation. It is not possible to buy anything with diners in Andorra. It is not possible to open an account in diners. It is only an artificial currency to produce commemorative coins.

In 1998 the General Council of the Valleys issued for the first time a series of diner denominated coins to commemorate the 250th anniversary of the Manual Digest.

See also
 Andorran euro coins

References

External links
 A complete gallery of the coins of Andorra Numista

Currencies of Andorra
Currencies of Europe